The Linate Airport disaster occurred in Italy at Linate Airport in Milan on the morning of Monday, 8 October 2001. Scandinavian Airlines System Flight 686, a McDonnell Douglas MD-87 airliner carrying 110 people bound for Copenhagen, Denmark, collided on take-off with a Cessna Citation CJ2 business jet carrying four people bound for Paris, France. All 114 people on both aircraft were killed, as well as four people on the ground.

The subsequent investigation determined that the collision was caused by a number of nonfunctioning and nonconforming safety systems, standards, and procedures at the airport. It remains the deadliest accident in Italian aviation history.

Aircraft and crew
Two aircraft were involved in the collision. The larger of the two aircraft was a McDonnell-Douglas MD-87. The cockpit crew consisted of Captain Joakim Gustafsson and First Officer Anders Hyllander, both aged 36. The Captain was hired by SAS in 1990 and had more than 5,800 hours of flight time. He had logged approximately 230 hours in the MD-87. The first officer was hired by the airline in 1997. At the time of the accident he had more than 4,300 total flying hours. He was more experienced in the aircraft type than his captain, having logged 2,000 hours of flight time in the MD-87.

The second aircraft was a Cessna Citation 525-A. There were two German pilots aboard. The captain, 36-year-old Horst Königsmann, had approximately 5,000 total flight hours logged, of which roughly 2,400 were accumulated in the Citation. The first officer, 64-year-old Martin Schneider, had approximately 12,000 flight hours' experience, of which 2,000 hours were in the Citation.
One of the passengers was Luca Fossati, chairman of Star – Stabilimento Alimentare S.p.A. and owner of the Citation.

Accident

The Cessna Citation was instructed to taxi from the western apron along the northern taxiway (taxiway R5), and then via the northern apron to the main taxiway which runs parallel to Runway 36R, a route that would have kept it clear of 36R. Instead, the pilot taxied along the southern taxi route (taxiway R6), crossing Runway 36R toward the main taxiway which lay beyond it (see diagram).

At 08:09:28, the MD-87 was given clearance by a different controller to take off from Runway 36R. One of the four people in the Cessna was killed on impact; the remaining three died in the subsequent fire. The remaining engine lost some thrust due to debris ingestion, and the plane, having lost the right landing gear, came down. Gustafsson applied thrust reverser and brakes, and tried to guide the plane through its control surfaces. In the impact, all the MD-87's crew and passengers were killed. The crash and subsequent fire killed four Italian ground personnel in the hangar, and injured four more.

Of the occupants of the MD-87, 54 (46%), mainly in the back of the aircraft, suffered severe burns; their bodies were identified using forensic dentistry or DNA records. Those in the front of the aircraft suffered severe blunt trauma. All of the occupants of the MD-87 were killed by impact, not fire.

Causes
The accident occurred less than a month after the September 11 attacks and the day after the U.S. invasion of Afghanistan began, but the Italian government was quick to rule out a terrorist attack as the cause. This was subsequently confirmed by the investigations that followed.

The accident was investigated by the National Agency for the Safety of Flight (ANSV). The ANSV's final report was published on 20 January 2004 and concluded that the "immediate cause" of the accident was the incursion of the Cessna aircraft onto the active runway. However, the ANSV stopped short of placing the blame entirely on the Cessna pilots, who had become lost in the fog. Their report identified a number of deficiencies in the airport layout and procedures.

Linate Airport was operating without a functioning ground radar system at the time, despite having had a new system approved on 30 March 1995. The previous system had been decommissioned on 29 November 1999, but the replacement had not been fully installed. The new system finally came online a few months later. Guidance signs along the taxiways were obscured, or badly worn, and were later found not to meet regulations. After the pilots mistakenly turned onto the R6 taxiway that led to the runway, there were no signs by which they could recognize where they were. When they stopped at a taxiway stop-marking, and correctly reported its identifier, S4, the ground controller disregarded this identification because it was not on his maps and was unknown to him. Motion sensing runway incursion alarms, although present, had been deactivated to prevent false alarms from vehicles, or animals. The ground controller's verbal directions used terminology to designate aprons, taxiways, and runways, which did not match their on-the-ground signage and labels.

Aftermath
On 16 April 2004, a Milan court found four persons guilty for the disaster. Airport director Vincenzo Fusco and air-traffic controller Paolo Zacchetti were both sentenced to eight years in prison. Francesco Federico, former head of the airport, and Sandro Gualano, former head of the air traffic control agency, received sentences of six and a half years. The pardon law issued by the Italian Parliament on 29 July 2006 reduced all convictions by three years. On 7 July 2006, Fusco and Federico were acquitted by the Milan Appeals Court. The controller Zacchetti's sentence was reduced to three years. In addition three more people were sentenced for multiple manslaughter and negligent disaster: former ENAV director general Fabio Marzocca to four years and four months, and; former SEA airports agency officials Antonio Cavanna and Lorenzo Grecchi each to three years and three months. On 20 February 2008 the Supreme Court of Cassation (Italy) upheld the acquittal of Fusco and Federico and confirmed five convictions. (Initially, in late 2002, eleven officials and functionaries had been charged with manslaughter.)

The initial eight-year sentence for Zacchetti prompted outrage among air traffic controllers. His sentence has been questioned in aviation safety law commentary.

Victims

Victims of the crash included nationals of nine different countries. Most of the victims were Italian and Scandinavian.

Four memorial services were held in honour of the SAS MD-87 victims. On 12 October, three separate ceremonies were held, with one in Denmark, one in Norway, and one in Sweden. On 13 October, a fourth ceremony was held in Italy.

In March 2002, a forest containing 118 beeches called Bosco dei Faggi was inaugurated as a memorial to the victims in the Forlanini Park near the airport. A sculpture by the Swedish artist Christer Bording donated by SAS, called Infinity Pain, was placed in the centre of the forest.

The disaster devastated the Swedish go-kart community as some of the country's most promising young drivers were on the flight after attending an event in Lonato.  After the disaster, the Swedish national motorsports club started a memorial fund together with some of the relatives.  The fund awards annual stipends to promising Swedish youth in go-kart.

Dramatization 
In 2012 the accident was featured on the 11th season of the Discovery Channel Canada / National Geographic TV series Mayday, in an episode entitled "The Invisible Plane".  The episode featured interviews with accident investigators, and a dramatization of the crash and investigation.

See also 
 List of accidents and incidents involving commercial aircraft

Notes

References 
 ANSV final report:

External links

National Agency for the Safety of Flight
Milano Linate, ground collision between Boeing MD-87, registration SE-DMA and Cessna 525-A, registration D-IEVX (Archive)
Final report (Archive)
 Milano Linate, collisione a terra tra Boeing MD-87, marche SE-DMA e Cessna 525-A, marche D-IEVX (Archive)  – the Italian version is the report of record. 
Final report (Archive) 
CVR Transcript (Archive)

Scandinavian Airlines
 Regarding Scandinavian Airlines flight SK 686 (1)
 Regarding Scandinavian Airlines flight SK 686 (2)
 Statement on Accident SK 686 Routed Milan – Copenhagen (3)
 Information about SK 686 Milan – Copenhagen Accident (4)
 Passenger and Crew List Scandinavian Airlines Flight SK 686 (5)
 Press Conference regarding flight SK 686 (6)
 Information about SK 686 Milan – Copenhagen Accident (7)
 SK686 Update: Nationality Distribution (8)
 Memorial Service for the casualties in Milan (9)

Other
 Cockpit Voice Recorder transcript and accident summary
 
 
 Looking back at Linate
 

2001 in Italy
2001 disasters in Italy
Airliner accidents and incidents involving ground collisions
Airliner accidents and incidents caused by pilot error
Airliner accidents and incidents involving fog
Aviation accidents and incidents in 2001
Aviation accidents and incidents in Italy
History of the Italian Republic
Runway incursions
Scandinavian Airlines accidents and incidents
Accidents and incidents involving the McDonnell Douglas MD-87
Accidents and incidents involving the Cessna Citation family
Aviation accidents and incidents caused by air traffic controller error
Disasters in Milan
2000s in Milan
October 2001 events in Europe
Man-made disasters in Italy